Enndé is a village in the commune of Bandiagara in the Cercle of Bandiagara in the Mopti Region of south-east Mali.

References

Populated places in Mopti Region